Darine Chahine (born 7 October 1981) has been a Lebanese talk show host on Al Jadeed since 2005. Her shows are Khedni Bhelmak and Kabsit Zir.

In 2001, she participated in the talent show Studio El Fan, winning as a host, while she was still studying at the Lebanese University.

Talk shows
 "Ekher Moda" (2018) on (Al Jadeed)
 "Khedni Bhelmak" (2016) on (Al Jadeed)
 "Kabsit Zir" (2012) on (Al Jadeed)

References 

1981 births
Living people
People from Beirut
Lebanese television presenters
Lebanese women television presenters
People from Jezzine
People from South Lebanon
Lebanese University alumni